Christian Tămaș (born 13 November 1964) is a Romanian writer, translator, essayist, arts and humanities researcher.

Biography 
Tămaș was born in the commune of Letca, in Sălaj County, northern Transylvania, Romania, on 13 November 1964. He graduated in Arabic language and literature from the University of Bucharest, in 1988. Later, in 2006, he obtained a master's degree in adult education at the Alexandru Ioan Cuza University in Iași and, in 2007, he earned a Doctorate in philosophy at the same university, with the thesis "Communication Strategies in the Qur'an".

His published works include novels, short stories, essays, literary criticism articles, scientific books and articles in the field of humanities, as well as translations from Italian, Arabic, Spanish, Catalan, French, English, Irish and Portuguese.

Since 2008, besides his research activity conducted at the Alexandru Ioan Cuza University, he delivers courses of Arabic language and civilization at the same university and at the Arab Cultural Center of Iași.

List of published works and translations (selective)
 

 Trezirea la nemurire, Ars Longa, 1997
 Strategii de comunicare in Coran, Ars Longa, 2007
 Seán Ó Curraoin, Beairtle (translation from Irish), Ars Longa, 2008
 Gaetano Mollo, Dincolo de angoasă: educația etico-religoasă la Sören Kierkegaard (translation from Italian), Ars Longa, 2000
 Dairena Ní Chinnéide, Luptătoarea și alte poezii (translation from Irish), Ars Longa, 2008
 Crize contemporane: disoluția sacrului, Ars Longa, 2003
 Crize contemporane: ofensiva islamului, Ars Longa, 2004
 The White Silence, Ars Longa, 2007
 Ignațiu de Loyola (Ignatius of Loyola), Exerciții spirituale (translation from Spanish), Polirom, 1996
 Tadeusz Rostworowski, Din gindirea filosofică a papei Ioan Paul al II-lea (translation from Italian), Ars Longa, 1995
 El. Avatarurile unui articol hotărât, Ars Longa, 2012
 Carles Miralles, Dulci și aspre (translation from Catalan), Ars Longa, 2008

Affiliations
 Romanian Association for Religious Studies
 Romanian Association of Semiotic Studies
 Réseau Francophone de Sociolinguistique (France)
 Center of Arabic Studies, University of Bucharest
 Writers' Union of Romania
 Société Internationale des Traducteurs d'Arabe (France)
 Maison Naaman pour la Culture (Lebanon)
 Casa del Poeta Peruano (Perú)

Awards
Prix Naaman (Lebanon), 2007
Writers' Union of Romania Prize, 2008
Gold Medal for Intellectual Excellence (Perú), 2012

Notes

References
Busuioc, Nicolae (1997). Scriitori ieșeni contemporani. Dicționar biobibliografic. Iaşi: Junimea. 
Busuioc, Nicolae (2002). Scriitori şi publiciști ieșeni contemporani. Iași: Vasiliana 98. 
Crăciun, Boris (2010). 1500 scriitori români, clasici și contemporani. Iași: La porțile Orientului. 
Crăciun, Boris (2011). Dicționarul scriitorilor români de azi. Iași: La porțile Orientului. 
Mir i Oliveras, Xavier. "Christian Tămaș", Visat. La revista digital de literatura i traducció del PEN Català. Barcelona, April 2013.
Rhea, Cristina (2013). Românii secolului XXI. București: Virtual.

External links 
 Christian Tămaș: Cuvântul este iubire, 29 noiembrie 2008, Ștefania Stan, Amos News
TRALICAT. ,, Barcelona.

Living people
1964 births
People from Sălaj County
University of Bucharest alumni
Alexandru Ioan Cuza University alumni
Romanian writers
Romanian translators
Romanian philosophers
Arabic–Romanian translators
Catalan–Romanian translators
French–Romanian translators
English–Romanian translators
Irish–Romanian translators
Italian–Romanian translators
Portuguese–Romanian translators
Spanish–Romanian translators